VHS J125601.92–125723.9 (abbreviated to VHS J1256–1257) is a young triple brown dwarf system located in the constellation Corvus approximately  from the Sun. The system consists of the equal-mass binary VHS J1256–1257AB and the distant planetary-mass companion VHS 1256–1257 b. In 2022, a continuous radio emission from the radiation belts surrounding VHS J1256–1257 was detected.

VHS 1256–1257 b
VHS 1256–1257 b was first identified and documented by the 2MASS survey in 2015. It orbits at a distance of 102 ± 9 AU and has an estimated mass of approximately  Jupiter masses.

The planet is carbon-rich, with a C/O molar ratio exceeding 0.63, and its temperature has been measured at 1380 K. VHS 1256-1257 b's rotation period has been measured to be 22.04 ± 0.05 hours, which is unusually long for substellar objects.

Spectroscopy
Observations with Hubble Wide-Field Camera 3 near-infrared time-series spectroscopic observations showed that VHS 1256 b varied with 19.3% at 1.1 and 1.7 μm over 8.5 hours. With the 1.27 μm filter the amplitude was even higher at 24.7%. This is the largest amplitude for any substellar object as of 2022, placing it in the mid-infrared. Later studies with the Hubble space telescope have yielded even higher brightness variability of 33-37% without a definite period, indicating a presence of both spots and waves.

Atmospheric composition
The atmosphere of VHS 1256 b is in a chemical disequilibrium. Carbon monoxide naturally reacts with hydrogen molecules in the atmosphere of brown dwarfs, forming methane and water molecules. The reaction works in both ways, meaning that methane reacts with water and releases hydrogen and carbon monoxide. At higher temperatures and lower pressure the reaction is tilted towards carbon monoxide and at lower temperatures and higher pressure the reaction is tilted towards methane. At equilibrium a cold brown dwarf or planet should have a high concentration of methane and a low concentration of carbon monoxide. The presence of carbon monoxide and depleted methane in the spectrum of VHS 1256 b compared to equilibrium atmospheric models suggests atmospheric mixing. The vertical mixing causes carbon monoxide to rise from lower and hotter atmospheric layers and methane to sink into these lower layers, forcing the upper atmosphere in chemical disequilibrium.

Water and carbon monoxide have both been detected in the atmosphere. The JWST observed the planet in 2022 by taking spectra at a wavelength of 1-20 μm with the instruments NIRSpec and MIRI. The team analysing the data found water vapor, methane, carbon monoxide, carbon dioxide, sodium, potassium and silicate clouds within the atmosphere of VHS 1256 b. The direct detection of silicate clouds is the first such detection reported for a planetary-mass object. The silicates are thought to be made of small amorphous silicate particles. The silicate feature in VHS 1256 b closely matches the silicate feature in the L4.5 brown dwarf 2M2224-0158, detected with Spitzer. The grain size and composition of the silicate clouds in VHS 1256 b will be modelled in the future.

References

External links 
 Planet VHS 1256-1257 b, Extrasolar Planets Encyclopaedia, 14 April 2020
 A New Spin to Solving Mystery of Stellar Companions, Rebecca Johnson, McDonald Observatory, 4 December 2017

Corvus (constellation)
Triple star systems
Brown dwarfs
M-type brown dwarfs
L-type stars
Astronomical objects discovered in 2015
J12560215-1257217
TIC objects
Planetary systems with one confirmed planet